Mere Dost Picture Abhi Baki Hai is a 2012 Hindi-language comedy film directed by Rajnish Thakur and produced by Narendra Singh. The film stars Sunil Shetty, Udita Goswami, Rajpal Yadav, and Om Puri amongst others. The film's title is adapted from a scene of Om Shanti Om featuring Shah Rukh Khan saying "Picture Abhi Baaki Hai, Mere Dost (The film isn't over yet, my friend)" apparently. The movie was a disaster on box office.

Cast
 Sunil Shetty as Amar Joshi
 Udita Goswami as Mohini
 Rajpal Yadav as Suraj
 Om Puri as Baig Saab
 Neena Gupta as Mummyji
 Rakesh Bedi as Monty
 Akhil Mishra as Guptaji
 Shayan Munshi as Hero
 Kurush Deboo as Producer
 Rajeev Verma as Amar's father
 Mumaith Khan as Tina
 Deepak Shirke as Sudama Bhosle
 Deepal Shaw as Sudama's girlfriend
 Razak Khan as abusive director
 Rana Jung Bahadur as Thakral
 Sudhir as Janardan/ Johny D Costa
 Falguni Rajani as maid in Indu Verma's filmi family.
 Shawar Ali as Hero
 Avtar Gill
 Suresh Menon
 Sonali Sachdev
 Dinesh Hingoo
 Ali

Plot

Picture Abhi Baki Hai is the journey of Amar Joshi (Sunil Shetty) who runs a video library in Benaras and aspires to be a film maker. Despite facing objection from his father Amar Joshi decides to sell his video library and joins a film Institute in London.

After completing his course he lands in the city of dreams "Mumbai" to make his film. Suraj (Rajpal Yadav) is a struggling actor doing bit roles in T.V. serials, who Is Amar's only connection in Bollywood.

Amar's starts his struggle to make his film by meeting different type of producers who have their own take on Amar's story. After many failed attempts He finally bumps into Monty Chadda (Rakesh Bedi) a P.R. Publicity man who sees good potential in Amar and decides to produce his film.

Amar & Monty take help of star secretary Guptaji (Akhil Mishra) to convince Mohini (Udita Goswami) & her starry mother Mummyji (Neena Gupta) who agrees to do the film.

Amar's film starts, But is stalled all of a sudden when Monty suddenly disappears. Amar is summoned by Sudama Bhosle (Deepak Shirke) a don who was financing his film. He wants Amar to complete his film and also wants him to cast his girlfriend "Tina" (Mummait Khan) Amar reluctantly agrees as he has no option. But as luck would have it Sudama Bhosle is shot dead and Amar's film is stalled once again. Monty Chaddha resurfaces again and decides to make Amar's Film into a magnum opus. so a veteran silver jubilee writer Mr. Baig (Om Puri) is brought on board. Once in, Mr. Baig takes over the reins of the film from Amar and changes it into a totally different film.

What follows is a chain of events which gives the audience a never seen before insight into the modus operandi of how films are generally made in Bollywood. In a nutshell, Picture Abhi Baki Hai will take you on a wild journey inside the dreamy world of Bollywood where you will see the reality of the largest film industry of the world. It won't just make you laugh; it will make you appreciate the efforts of those who try to entertain you every minute.

Soundtrack

References

External links
 
 

2012 films
2012 comedy films
Films about filmmaking
2010s Hindi-language films
Indian comedy films
Hindi-language comedy films